There are 337 municipalities in the canton of Bern, Switzerland.

List 

Aarberg
Aarwangen
Adelboden
Aefligen
Aegerten
Aeschi bei Spiez
Affoltern im Emmental
Alchenstorf
Allmendingen
Amsoldingen
Arch
Arni
Attiswil
Auswil
Bannwil
Bargen
Bäriswil
Bätterkinden
Beatenberg
Bellmund
Belp
Belprahon
Berken
Bern
Bettenhausen
Biel/Bienne
Biglen
Bleienbach
Blumenstein
Bolligen
Boltigen
Bönigen
Bowil
Bremgarten bei Bern
Brenzikofen
Brienz
Brienzwiler
Brügg
Brüttelen
Buchholterberg
Büetigen
Bühl
Büren an der Aare
Burgdorf
Burgistein
Busswil bei Melchnau
Champoz
Corcelles
Corgémont
Cormoret
Cortébert
Court
Courtelary
Crémines
Därligen
Därstetten
Deisswil bei Münchenbuchsee
Diemtigen
Diessbach bei Büren
Dotzigen
Dürrenroth
Eggiwil
Epsach
Eriswil
Eriz
Erlach
Erlenbach im Simmental
Ersigen
Eschert
Evilard
Fahrni
Farnern
Ferenbalm
Finsterhennen
Forst-Längenbühl
Fraubrunnen
Frauenkappelen
Freimettigen
Frutigen
Gals
Gampelen
Gerzensee
Gondiswil
Graben
Grandval
Grindelwald
Grossaffoltern
Grosshöchstetten
Gsteig bei Gstaad
Gsteigwiler
Guggisberg
Gündlischwand
Gurbrü
Gurzelen
Guttannen
Habkern
Hagneck
Hasle bei Burgdorf
Hasliberg
Häutligen
Heiligenschwendi
Heimberg
Heimenhausen
Heimiswil
Hellsau
Herbligen
Hermrigen
Herzogenbuchsee
Hilterfingen
Hindelbank
Höchstetten
Hofstetten bei Brienz
Homberg
Horrenbach-Buchen
Huttwil
Iffwil
Inkwil
Innertkirchen
Ins
Interlaken
Ipsach
Iseltwald
Ittigen
Jaberg
Jegenstorf
Jens
Kallnach
Kandergrund
Kandersteg
Kappelen
Kaufdorf
Kehrsatz
Kernenried
Kiesen
Kirchberg
Kirchdorf
Kirchlindach
Köniz
Konolfingen
Koppigen
Krattigen
Krauchthal
Kriechenwil
La Ferrière
La Neuveville
Landiswil
Langenthal
Langnau im Emmental
Lauenen
Laupen
Lauperswil
Lauterbrunnen
Leissigen
Lengnau
Lenk im Simmental
Leuzigen
Ligerz
Linden
Lotzwil
Loveresse
Lüscherz
Lütschental
Lützelflüh
Lyss
Lyssach
Madiswil
Matten bei Interlaken
Mattstetten
Meienried
Meikirch
Meinisberg
Meiringen
Melchnau
Merzligen
Mirchel
Mont-Tramelan
Moosseedorf
Mörigen
Moutier
Mühleberg
Münchenbuchsee
Münchenwiler
Münsingen
Müntschemier
Muri bei Bern
Neuenegg
Nidau
Niederbipp
Niederhünigen
Niedermuhlern
Niederönz
Niederried bei Interlaken
Nods
Oberbalm
Oberbipp
Oberburg
Oberdiessbach
Oberhofen am Thunersee
Oberhünigen
Oberlangenegg
Oberried am Brienzersee
Oberthal
Oberwil bei Büren
Oberwil im Simmental
Ochlenberg
Oeschenbach
Oppligen
Orpund
Orvin
Ostermundigen
Perrefitte
Péry-La Heutte
Petit-Val
Pieterlen
Plateau de Diesse
Pohlern
Port
Radelfingen
Rapperswil
Rebévelier
Reconvilier
Reichenbach im Kandertal
Reisiswil
Renan
Reutigen
Riggisberg
Ringgenberg
Roches
Roggwil
Rohrbach
Rohrbachgraben
Romont
Röthenbach im Emmental
Rubigen
Rüderswil
Rüdtligen-Alchenflüh
Rüeggisberg
Rüegsau
Rumendingen
Rumisberg
Rüschegg
Rüti bei Büren
Rüti bei Lyssach
Rütschelen
Saanen
Safnern
Saicourt
Saint-Imier
Sauge
Saules
Saxeten
Schangnau
Schattenhalb
Schelten
Scheuren
Schüpfen
Schwadernau
Schwanden bei Brienz
Schwarzenburg
Schwarzhäusern
Seeberg
Seedorf
Seehof
Seftigen
Signau
Sigriswil
Siselen
Sonceboz-Sombeval
Sonvilier
Sorvilier
Spiez
St. Stephan
Steffisburg
Stettlen
Stocken-Höfen
Studen
Sumiswald
Sutz-Lattrigen
Täuffelen
Tavannes
Teuffenthal
Thierachern
Thörigen
Thun
Thunstetten
Thurnen
Toffen
Trachselwald
Tramelan
Treiten
Trub
Trubschachen
Tschugg
Twann-Tüscherz
Uebeschi
Uetendorf
Unterlangenegg
Unterseen
Ursenbach
Urtenen-Schönbühl
Uttigen
Utzenstorf
Valbirse
Vechigen
Villeret
Vinelz
Wachseldorn
Wald
Walkringen
Walliswil bei Niederbipp
Walliswil bei Wangen
Walperswil
Walterswil
Wangen an der Aare
Wangenried
Wattenwil
Wengi
Wichtrach
Wiedlisbach
Wiggiswil
Wilderswil
Wiler bei Utzenstorf
Wileroltigen
Willadingen
Wimmis
Wohlen bei Bern
Worb
Worben
Wynau
Wynigen
Wyssachen
Zäziwil
Zielebach
Zollikofen
Zuzwil
Zweisimmen
Zwieselberg

Mergers
January 1, 2004
Englisberg and Zimmerwald merge to form Wald
Niederwichtrach and Oberwichtrach merge to form Wichtrach

January 1, 2007
Forst and Längenbühl merge to form Forst-Längenbühl
Gutenburg and Madiswil merge to form Madiswil

January 1, 2008
Oberönz and Herzogenbuchsee merge to form Herzogenbuchsee

January 1, 2009
Wanzwil, Heimenhausen and Röthenbach bei Herzogenbuchsee merge to form Heimenhausen
Rüti bei Riggisberg and Riggisberg merge to form Riggisberg

January 1, 2010
Ballmoos and Jegenstorf merge to form Jegenstorf
Twann and Tüscherz-Alfermée merge to form Twann-Tüscherz
Untersteckholz and Langenthal merge to form Langenthal
Aeschlen bei Oberdiessbach and Oberdiessbach merge to form Oberdiessbach

January 1, 2011
Bettenhausen and Bollodingen merge to form Bettenhausen
Busswil bei Büren and Lyss merge to form Lyss
Leimiswil, Kleindietwil and Madiswil merge to form Madiswil
Wahlern and Albligen merge to form Schwarzenburg

January 1, 2012
Belp and Belpberg merge to form Belp

January 1, 2013
Kallnach and Niederried bei Kallnach merge to form Kallnach
Rapperswil BE and Ruppoldsried merge to form Rapperswil BE
Münsingen and Trimstein merge to form Münsingen

January 1, 2014
Büren zum Hof, Etzelkofen, Fraubrunnen, Grafenried, Limpach, Mülchi, Schalunen and Zauggenried merge to form Fraubrunnen
Gadmen and Innertkirchen merge to form Innertkirchen
Jegenstorf, Münchringen and Scheunen merge to form Jegenstorf
Bleiken bei Oberdiessbach and Oberdiessbach merge to form Oberdiessbach
Lamboing, Diesse and Prêles merge to form Plateau de Diesse
Plagne and Vauffelin merge to form Sauge
Höfen bei Thun, Niederstocken and Oberstocken merge to form Stocken-Höfen
Kienersrüti and Uttigen merge to form Uttigen

January 1, 2015
La Heutte and Péry merge to form Péry-La Heutte
Châtelat, Monible, Sornetan and Souboz merge to form Petit-Val
Bévilard, Malleray and Pontenet merge to form Valbirse

January 1, 2016
Ersigen, Niederösch and Oberösch merge to form Ersigen
Bangerten and Rapperswil BE merge to form Rapperswil BE
Hermiswil and Seeberg merge to form Seeberg

January 1, 2017
Münsingen and Tägertschi merge to form Münsingen

January 1, 2018
Grosshöchstetten and Schlosswil merge to form Grosshöchstetten
Gelterfingen, Kirchdorf, Mühledorf and Noflen merge to form Kirchdorf

January 1, 2019
Golaten and Kallnach merge to form Kallnach

January 1, 2020
Schwendibach and Steffisburg merge to form Steffisburg
Niederbipp and Wolfisberg merge to form Niederbipp
Kirchenthurnen, Lohnstorf and Mühlethurnen merge to form Thurnen

January 1, 2021
Langenthal and Obersteckholz merge to form Langenthal
Riggisberg and Rümligen merge to form Riggisberg
Hindelbank and Mötschwil merge to form Hindelbank

January 1, 2022
Clavaleyres and Murten (Canton of Freiburg) merge to form Murten

January 1, 2023
Diemerswil and Münchenbuchsee merge to form Münchenbuchsee

References

 
Bern
Subdivisions of the canton of Bern